Vari-Prop, founded in 2004 by Larry Morgan, was an American manufacturer of composite propellers for homebuilt and light-sport aircraft. The company headquarters was originally located in Cottonwood, California and later in Beaverton, Oregon.

The company's line of propellers started development in 1988 and consisted of variable-pitch, ground-adjustable and constant-speed propellers.

By 2016 the company's website was for sale and the company business seems to have been wound up.

See also
List of aircraft propeller manufacturers

References

External links 
Official website archives on Archive.org

Companies established in 2004
Aircraft propeller manufacturers
Aerospace companies of the United States
Companies based in Beaverton, Oregon